Cape Melville is a headland in the Avannaata municipality, NW Greenland.

Geography
Cape Melville is located at the eastern end of Meteor Bay. 

The cape lies at the northern limits of Melville Bay to the east of Cape York. A chain of small coastal islands stretches between the two capes, the largest of which is Meteorite Island.

See also
Cape York meteorite

References

Melville